Bass traps are acoustic energy absorbers which are designed to damp low frequency sound energy with the goal of attaining a flatter low frequency (LF) room response by reducing LF resonances in rooms. They are commonly used in recording studios, mastering rooms, home theatres and other rooms built to provide a critical listening environment. Like all acoustically absorptive devices, they function by turning sound energy into heat through friction.

General description—types

There are generally two types of bass traps: resonant absorbers and porous absorbers. Resonant absorbers are further divided into panel absorbers and Helmholtz resonators.

Both types are effective, but whereas a resonant absorber needs to be mechanically tuned to resonate in sympathy with the frequencies being absorbed, a porous absorber does not resonate and need not be tuned.

Porous absorbers tend to be smaller in size and are easier to design and build, as well as less expensive overall than resonant absorbers. However, the deep bass attenuation of a porous absorber is generally inferior, so its usefulness for attenuating lower frequency room resonances is more limited.

Resonating absorbers tend to absorb a narrower spectrum and porous absorbers tend to absorb a broader spectrum. The spectrum of both types can be either narrowed or broadened by design but the generalized difference in bandwidth and tunability dominates their respective performance.

Examples of resonating type bass traps include a rigid container with one or more portholes or slots (i.e. Helmholtz resonator), or a rigid container with a flexible diaphragm (i.e. membrane absorber). Resonating type bass trap achieves absorption of sound by sympathetic vibration of some free element of the device with the air volume of the room.

Resonating absorbers vary in construction, with one type of membrane absorber using a springy sheet of wood that attaches to the enclosure only along the edges/corners, and another using a more floppy sheet of thin material stretched like a drumhead. A Helmholtz resonator can have one port tuned to a single frequency, or several ports tuned to either a single or to multiple frequencies, with round port, slotted port, or even perforated construction. Resonating absorbers often incorporate porous absorption internally to simultaneously lower the resonant frequency and broaden the spectrum of absorption.

Porous absorbers are most commonly made from fiberglass, mineral wool or open cell foam that resists the passage of air molecules through the interstitial space. Porous absorbers often incorporate a foil or paper facing to reflect frequencies above 500 Hz. Facing also improves low bass absorption by translating the physical compression of air at the facing into physical compression of the fibers that are in contact with the facing while also maintaining the resistive loss of air as it is driven through the bulk of the fiber by the facing.

Design concepts for building bass traps

Resonating bass traps

Resonating bass traps will absorb sound with high efficiency at their fundamental frequency of resonance. As such, a knowledge of the frequencies of resonances which require damping is helpful before designing and constructing a resonating bass trap. This can be attained by calculation of the room's modes or by direct measurement of the room itself.

Resonating absorbers can be broadened in the frequency range of efficacy to some degree by either introducing porous absorptive material to the interior of the vessel, by constraining the vibrations of the panel or membrane, or by installing an array of resonating devices each tuned to adjacent frequency ranges so that collectively the array functions over a broadened range of sounds.  Such devices can be enormously effective over their tuned range, but can take up a great deal of space, especially when installed in arrays, and thus are sometimes not a practical solution.

Panel absorber

A simple panel resonator can be built to hang on a wall by building a wooden frame, adding several inches of mineral wool to the inside, and fitting a sheet of plywood over the top attached only at the edges.  A small gap should be left between the panel and the acoustic insulation so that the panel is free to resonate. Panel resonance can be enhanced by reducing the point of connection between the panel and the frame by means of narrow spacer material such as a loop of wire or welding rod run along the edge of the frame so that the panel is perched on a thin edge. Approximate full sheet [4' × 8'] plywood panel resonances when mounted on a 1×4 frame 3.5" deep are:

1/8" plywood = 150 Hz
1/4" plywood = 110 Hz
3/8" plywood =  87 Hz

Helmholtz resonator
Other common resonating bass traps are forms of the Helmholtz resonator—such as either a stiff walled box with a hole in one side [a port], or a series of slats over-mounted across the face as a stiff-walled box forming narrow openings in the cracks between the slat members.

Porous absorber bass traps
A bass trap generally comprises a core absorbent damp material, a frame, and a covering for aesthetic reasons.

 Core: Semi-rigid glass-wool or mineral-wool insulation boards or dense open-cell foam are typically used. 
 Frame: A steel exterior frame is preferred, although wood skeleton frames are common. The frame acts as a housing, allowing mounting to walls and ceilings, and also anchors the covering material.
 Covering: Porous fabric (similar to speaker grill cloth) is usually used.

Positioning

Since low frequency resonances in a room have their points of maximum or minimum pressure in the corners of the room, resonant bass traps mounted in these positions will be the most efficient, while porous traps are most efficient at the points of high particle velocity such as 1/4 the desired wavelength away from the wall. Bass traps are typically used to attenuate modal resonances and so exact placement depends on which room mode one is trying to target. Bass traps typically combine structural mechanisms that can work at both positions of high particle velocity/low pressure (thick fiberglass) and high pressure/low particle velocity (membranes).

Porous bass trap absorbers need to be very thick to be effective at lower frequencies so they tend to be allocated either as diagonal wedges in the corners or as thick rectangular bulk behind false walls where they are out of the way and less likely to disrupt higher frequencies or room function. Air gap behind a porous panel absorber e.g. straddling a corner also helps to ensure it protrudes more into the room where there is more air velocity, improving its velocity-based absorption and extending its bandwidth while inducing some ripple in its absorption spectrum. Resonant bass trap absorbers need to be at a pressure maximum and tend to be thinner, so they are more conveniently and effectively positioned flat against a wall in a corner where the pressure is maximum, rather than straddling a corner where there is more velocity.

Standard practice is to investigate the applicability of porous bass trap absorbers before investigating resonant or hybridized bass trap absorbers. Complementary methods to use in combination with porous absorption include drywall/stud construction of walls/ceiling and filled with insulation as a form of highly damped resonant bass trapping using the drywall itself as the membrane. The combination of inherently lossy resonant room boundaries and paper or foil faced porous bass trap absorption deep in the tricorners (where three room boundaries meet) is often sufficient to attain acceptable bass response even in listening rooms with somewhat problematic resonances.

Adjusting the listening position within the room boundaries and elevating the seating with a riser that is filled with porous absorption is one more method that can improve bass response without resorting to resonant bass trapping, while simultaneously improving home theater screen visibility.

Small listening rooms suffer a paucity of low frequency resonances with gaps between them, so another complementary method is adding a subwoofer to drive the room resonances from an optimal physical location that minimizes ripple in the frequency response at the listening position. Yet another complementary method is splitting an existing subwoofer allocation up into multiple smaller subwoofers in spatially separated locations that increase the degrees of freedom available to tune the response with. Multiple subwoofers also tend to smooth the bass response across a larger listening area and are often easier to place for good bass response than a single larger subwoofer (or no subwoofer).

If the response is somewhat uniform across all listening positions using these methods, equalization can be used to shape the bass response to the desired target and further smooth out any remaining ripple.

Some combination of porous absorption with these complementary methods is typically preferred for their simplicity, affordability, and convenience, but resonant bass traps are more effective for absorbing strong room resonances where the aforementioned complementary methods are inadequate or impractical, particularly when the geometry of the room causes problematic narrow-band resonances that affect the low bass and the composition of the room boundaries is highly reflective rather than acoustically lossy.

Further reading 

Everest, F. Alton. The Master Handbook of Acoustics, McGraw-Hill, 2000.
Kinsler, Frey, Coppens and Sanders, Fundamentals of Acoustics, Third Edition, John Wiley & Sons, 1999, Section 10.8: “The Helmholtz Resonator”.
 https://www.soundonsound.com/sos/may06/articles/qa0506_3.htm

References

Acoustics